Make Them Bleed is the debut studio album by American heavy metal band Terror Universal. It was released on January 19, 2018 via Minus Head Records.

Track listing 
All tracks written by Terror Universal.

 "Passage of Pain"
 "Welcome to Hell"
 "Spines"
 "Make Them Bleed"
 "Through the Mirrors"
 "Dig You a Hole"
 "Dead on Arrival"
 "Into Darkness"
 "Your Time Has Come"
 "Piece by Piece"

Chart positions 

 No. 17 Billboard Hard Music chart
 No. 3 Metal Contraband's Most Added chart (#11 overall debut)
 No. 27 NACC Loud Rock chart

References 

2018 debut albums
Terror Universal albums